Lahashar (also Romanized as Lāḩashar; also known as Lahash) is a village in Lafmejan Rural District, in the Central District of Lahijan County, Gilan Province, Iran. At the 2006 census, its population was 83, in 31 families.

References 

Populated places in Lahijan County